is a Japanese superhero kaiju film, serving as the sequel and film adaptation of the 2017 Ultra Series television series Ultraman Geed. It was released in Japan on March 10, 2018.

The movie's advertising slogan is

Plot

Gillvalis began his reign of terror by sending his Galactron to attack the residents of Planet Kushia. Guided by her father's will, Airu barely escaped to an ancient Earth.

Fast forward to the present day, Gillvalis' forces continue to attack various planets in order to search the "red steel" as Space Garrison and Ultimate Force Zero tried their best to fight back. On Earth, his loss from Galactron MK2 caused Riku to develop a sense of doubt towards his own capabilities. Juggler navigated the Nebula House residents and AIB duo Moa and Zena towards Okinawa to find the "red steel". They encountered Leito among the crowds, who lead them to the tourist guide Airu and finally the "red steel" itself, but neither of them were capable of wielding it. In order to gather more info, the team ventured into a secret alien city to find the information broker Arlong, where Gai Kurenai joined them after saving the party in a bar brawl between aliens. Gai met his junior Riku for the first time and counseled the boy of the responsibilities in being an Ultra Warrior.

As Gillvalis prepare to reset all life on Earth, Gai/Orb and Riku/Geed fought against Galactron MK2 but even with Zero's intervention, none of their attacks were capable of dealing even a single scratch. With Orb and Zero's apparent demise, Geed gave into his anger and defeated the robot enforcer in full power. With Riku knocked out of transformation and required another 20 hours to transform, Gillvalis prepared to digitize all life on Earth while the Galactron Army commenced their worldwide attack. Juggler took matters by fighting in his giant form while the rest of the party deal with Valis Raiders. Orb and Zero appeared unharmed after the latter used his time manipulation and bonded with Leito to assume Zero Beyond. The death of Airu from a Galactron's firepower served as the final push for Riku to unlock the "red steel" as Giga Finalizer. By assuming Ultimate Final, Geed bypassed his cool down period and helped the others exterminating the remaining Galactron Army. With Juggler exhausted, the Ultras storm Planet Kushia where Gillvalis assumed his Perfect Form to deal with the invaders. Orb and Zero destroyed his body, leaving Geed to finally destroy his escaping probe and put an end to his reign of terror permanently.

In aftermath of the battle, the returned humans and Gukuru Shisa celebrated Geed's victory while the Nebula House residents bid farewell to Ultimate Force Zero. Following Gai and Juggler's departure in the mid-credit scene, Zena paid his final respect to Gukuru in its petrified form. Moa caught his partner's attention by revealing Airu's presence in the Pacific Records.

Production
The original filming took place in September 2017 within Okinawa Prefecture, according to guest actor Yuika Motokariya. The news of Ultraman Geed The Movie' was firstly announced by November 23, 2017 with May J. singing the film's ending theme. The first trailer was aired in November 30, 2017, followed by the list of cast and plot summary of the movie.

Cast
/: 
: 
: 
: 
: 
: 
: 
: 
Bartender: 
Newscaster: 
Academician: 
: 
/:

Voice cast
: 
: 
Alien Shadow "Zena": 
: 
: 
: 
: 
: 
: 
: 
: 
: 
: 
:

Theme song

Lyrics: 
Composition: 
Arrangement: 
Artist: May J.

References

External links 
 at Tsuburaya Productions 

2018 films
2010s Japanese-language films
Ultra Series films
Shochiku films
Films set in Okinawa Prefecture
2010s Japanese films